The Crewe Kings was a British Speedway team which operated in Crewe, Cheshire from 1969 until its closure in 1975.

History
The team first competed in 1969 promoted by Maury Littlechild for Allied Presentations who also promoted the Rayleigh Rockets, the Sunderland Stars and the Reading Racers. Littlechild died on 12 July 1972 - a year when the Kings achieved the League and Cup double and Phil Crump won the Division Two riders championship; Ken Adams took over until the end of the season.

In 1973, Len Silver took over on behalf of Allied Presentations, continuing in that role until former Crewe rider Dave Parry took over in 1975. The Earle Street track established itself as the fastest track in the UK. Originally 470 yards long, it was feared by many riders but was shortened to 436 yards in 1971, both versions had their track records in the Guinness Book of Records for the fastest average speeds.

The team was renowned for developing young riding talent, giving early opportunities to Geoff Curtis, Phil Crump, Les Collins, John Jackson, Dave Morton, Ian Cartwright and Chris Turner. 

However, the club started to run into financial difficulties at the end of 1974 with Dave Parry taking over in 1975 before closing at the end of the season. It ran as a training school for two more years.

A memorial plaque to Crewe Kings was unveiled in the nearby Kings Arms pub in September 2010.

Crewe LMR
The speedway track also operated for a short time in the late 1920s / early 1930s. Previously also used as a cycling and athletics track, it encircled a cricket pitch that was used by Crewe Alexandra cricket club from 1898 (following its relocation from the Alexandra Recreation Ground on Nantwich Road), and by its successor, Crewe LMR (London Midland Region) cricket club until 1975. The track's site is now the location of the Grand Junction retail park.

Notable riders

Season summary

References

Defunct British speedway teams
1969 establishments in England
Crewe